Mykland is a rural village in northwestern Froland municipality in Agder county, Norway. The village is located in a hilly, forested area that is the site of many small rivers and lakes. The village of Mykland was the administrative centre of the old municipality of Mykland which existed from 1876 until 1967 when the municipality was merged into Froland. The village has a school, store, gas station, and Mykland Church.

History
In the summer of 2008, there was a major forest fire in the areas surrounding the village of Mykland. The fire was one of the worst forest fires of the last 150 years in Norway. Nearly  of forest burned. The fire was fought by more than 300 people from the fire department, the military, the civil defense, and the Red Cross. The village of Mykland was threatened by the fire from three sides. Several summer cabins burned but fortunately there was no inhabited housing that was lost.

Name
The municipality (originally the parish) is named after the old Mykland farm (Old Norse: Myklaland), since the first Mykland Church was built there. The first element is mykill which means "great" and the last element is land which means "land".

Attractions
Mykland has great scenery of hills and forests along with many fishing lakes and many camping locations. Canoeing in the nearby lake Myklandsvatna is also quite popular. There is also a museum and a shooting range in Mykland.

Mykland Church is a small wooden, octagonal church that dates back to 1832, with angels in the sky painted on the ceiling inside. Mykland has had a church since 1682.

Notable residents
Nils Belland, an artist
Knut Mykland, a historian

References

External links

Froland
Villages in Agder